Richard William Scobee (born April 13, 1964) is a retired lieutenant general in the United States Air Force. Scobee was commander of the Air Force Reserve Command at Robins Air Force Base from 2018 to 2022. He is the son of Dick Scobee, an American test pilot and astronaut who perished in the Space Shuttle Challenger disaster.

Air Force career

Richard Scobee was born in Tucson, Arizona, and raised in Houston, Texas. He graduated from the United States Air Force Academy and was commissioned as a second lieutenant in the United States Air Force in 1986. He attended Euro-NATO Joint Jet Pilot training (ENJJPT) at Sheppard Air Force Base in Wichita Falls, Texas, graduating in 1987. He became an F-16 Fighting Falcon pilot, and was stationed Macdill Air Force Base, Ramstein Air Base, Shaw Air Force Base, and Kunsan Air Base throughout his career. He served as the commander of the 301st Fighter Squadron and the 301st Fighter Wing at Naval Air Station Joint Reserve Base Fort Worth, and the 944th Operations Group and the 944th Fighter Wing at Luke Air Force Base. Additionally, he served as the commander of the 506th Air Expeditionary Group at Kirkuk Air Base in 2008. As a general officer, he has served as a Deputy Director of Operations at NORAD, the Commander of the Tenth Air Force, and as the Deputy Commander of Air Force Reserve Command. In September 2018, he assumed command of the Air Force Reserve Command.

Awards and decorations

Effective dates of promotions

References

1964 births
Living people
People from Houston
Recipients of the Air Force Distinguished Service Medal
Recipients of the Defense Superior Service Medal
Recipients of the Legion of Merit
United States Air Force Academy alumni
United States Air Force generals
United States Air Force personnel of the Iraq War